The 2021 New York City Public Advocate election was held on November 2, 2021. The incumbent, Jumaane Williams, was re-elected. Williams defeated Dr. Devi Nampiaparampil, a physician running on the Republican party line in the general election.

Democratic primary

Candidates
 Theo Chino, bitcoin entrepreneur
 Anthony Herbert, activist and consultant
 Jumaane Williams, incumbent

Primary election results

Republican Party

Candidate

 Devi Nampiaparampil, doctor and commentator

Endorsements

Working Families Party

Candidate

Declared
Jumaane Williams Petitions to be on the Working Families Party line were disqualified by the Board of Elections.

General election

Candidates
 Devi Nampiaparampil (Save Our City)
 Theo Chino (Black Woman Lead) Petitions to be on the Black Woman Lead Party line were disqualified by the Board of Elections.
 Theo Chino (Love) Petitions to be on the Love Party line were disqualified by the Board of Elections.
 Devin W. Balkind (Libertarian)

Results

References

New York City Public Advocate
2021
Public Advocate election
November 2021 events in the United States